Jack & Diane is a 2012 American romantic horror film written and directed by Bradley Rust Gray and starring Riley Keough and Juno Temple.

Plot
Diane is an English girl in her late teens who's visiting with her aunt in New York and suffers from chronic nosebleeds. She checks herself in a mirror and transforms into a werewolf-like monster before falling unconscious. Earlier, she walks in the streets trying to borrow a cellphone in order to call her twin sister Karen. Having no luck, she enters a clothing store and asks to use a phone. There, she meets a girl of her age, Jack, who presents as butch and is instantly smitten by Diane. Diane's nose starts bleeding again and Jack helps her. Jack then takes Diane to a night club. Diane seems nauseated, and she goes to the restroom. Once she feels better, she meets up with Jack and the girls passionately kiss.

By morning, the girls part ways and Jack is hit by a car, though not badly harmed. At her aunt's home, Diane is reprimanded by Aunt Linda, who tells her she is grounded. Both of the girls feel misunderstood by their respective parent figures. Diane visits Jack in her home. Jack confides in Diane about a cassette tape with the song "Only You" that she kept as memento of her late brother. Not having access to a personal phone, Diane asks her sister Karen to call Jack pretending to be Diane. When Jack tries to have phone sex with her, Karen reveals she's not really Diane. The next day, Jack visits Diane at her aunt's and the girls get into an argument when Linda intentionally tells Jack about Diane soon leaving to attend fashion school in Paris, along with her sister. This and the fake phone call anger Jack, who leaves abruptly.

With Jack not wanting to be with her anymore, Diane suffers from desolation. Meanwhile, Jack hangs out with a colleague, Tara. They have an intimate moment but Jack rebuffs her shortly thereafter. The next day, Diane hangs out in the store where Jack works with one of Jack's friends, Chris, to Jack's annoyance. Jack asks Diane to leave, but Diane challenges her to a childish game. Jack wins so Diane is forced to go. Jack gets back to Chris, who found a video of Diane's sister getting raped on an adult website. Despite their falling out, Jack seeks Diane to tell her about the video. After Diane talks to Karen on the phone, she and Jack reconcile. Diane wants to go back home to be with Karen, but Karen refuses. Diane says she always felt like the stronger sister.

Over the next few days, Jack and Diane spend a lot of time together. One night, Diane has a dream of transforming into a monster and devouring Jack's heart. She wakes up only to find Jack at her side with blood gushing out of her nose. As the days narrow down before Diane has to leave for school, the bond between the two girls is threatened by the upcoming separation. While they're in a locker room to retrieve Diane's suitcases, the lights suddenly go off. In the dark, Diane is startled by the monster she had previously dreamed of transforming into. Jack goes to see Diane on her last day in New York and the two girls console each other, finally letting go of their fears.

After a few weeks, Diane receives a cassette player with the tape made by Jack's brother. She turns the song on and listens to it profoundly.

Cast
 Juno Temple as Diane
 Temple also plays Diane's twin sister Karen, who's only heard through the phone and seen in a video
 Riley Keough as Jack
 Cara Seymour as Aunt Linda
 Kylie Minogue as Tara
 Haviland Morris as Jack's mother
 Dane DeHaan as Chris
 Michael Chernus as Jaimie
 Lou Taylor Pucci as Tom
 Neal Huff as Jerry

Production 
Olivia Thirlby and Elliot Page were originally cast for the lead roles in 2008 before the project was postponed.

Page's role was later replaced by Alison Pill, who also ended up not being in the film either.

Music
Australian singer Kylie Minogue and Icelandic band Múm recorded and released a promotional single, "Whistle", for the soundtrack.

Reception
Jack & Diane received mixed to negative reviews. It currently holds a 15% rating on Rotten Tomatoes, based on 27 reviews with an average rating of 4.00/10. On Metacritic, it has a weighted average rating of 45 out of 100 based on 11 reviews, signifying "mixed or average reviews".

Notes

References

External links
 
 
 
 
 

2012 films
2012 horror films
2012 independent films
2012 LGBT-related films
2012 romantic drama films
2010s horror drama films
American horror drama films
American independent films
American LGBT-related films
American romantic drama films
Films about twin sisters
Films set in New York City
Films shot in New York City
Lesbian-related films
LGBT-related horror films
LGBT-related romantic drama films
American romantic horror films
American werewolf films
2010s English-language films
2010s American films